Cyprus competed in the 2010 Commonwealth Games held in Delhi, India winning 11 medals.

Medalists

See also
2010 Commonwealth Games

References

Nations at the 2010 Commonwealth Games
Cyprus at the Commonwealth Games
2010 in Cypriot sport